The 2009 Ukrainian Amateur Cup was the fourteenth annual season of Ukraine's football knockout competition for amateur football teams. The competition started on 12 August 2009 and concluded on 25 October 2009.

Participated clubs

 Cherkasy Oblast: Khodak Cherkasy
 Chernihiv Oblast: Yednist-2 Plysky, Polissia Dobrianka (Ripky Raion)
 Ivano-Frankivsk Oblast: Karpaty Yaremche
 Kharkiv Oblast: Lokomotyv Kupyansk
 Khmelnytska Oblast: Proskuriv Khmelnytsky
 Kirovohrad Oblast: Olimpik Kirovohrad, UkrAhroKom Holovkivka (Oleksandriya Raion)
 Kyiv Oblast: Vyshneve, Zenit Boyarka
 Luhansk Oblast: Krasnodonvuhillia Krasnodon, Popasna

 Lviv Oblast: Karpaty Kamyanka-Buzka
 Mykolaiv Oblast: Voronivka (Voznesensk Raion)
 Odessa Oblast: Bastion-2 Illichivsk, Bryz Izmail
 Rivne Oblast: ODEK Orzhiv (Rivne Raion)
 Ternopil Oblast: Tovtry Kozliv
 Volyn Oblast: Shakhtar Novovolynsk
 Zakarpattia Oblast: Poliana (Svaliava Raion)
 Zhytomyr Oblast: Zviahel 750 Novohrad-Volynsky, Khimmash Korosten

Competition schedule

Preliminary round
The matches were played August 12 and 19, 2009.

First round (1/8)
The matches were played August 26 and September 2, 2009.

Quarterfinals (1/4)
The matches were played September 9 and 23, 2009.

Semifinals (1/2)
The matches were played October 3-4, 10-11, 2009.

Final
The matches were played October 17 and 25, 2009.

See also
 2009 Ukrainian Football Amateur League
 2009–10 Ukrainian Cup

References
 2009 Ukrainian Amateur Cup at the Footpass (Football Federation of Ukraine)
  2009 Amateur Cup on the FFU website

2009
Amateur Cup
Ukrainian Amateur Cup